Plaza del Caribe is an enclosed shopping mall located in Ponce, Puerto Rico. It is owned by Empresas Fonalledas, and is the largest mall in southern Puerto Rico. The mall is located at the intersection of Puerto Rico Highway 2 and Highway 12. The anchor stores are JCPenney and Macy's. A former third anchor store, Sears, closed in February 2020.

History

Originally starting development through 1969-1972, and even being scheduled to open by 1974, the mall officially came to fruition on 11 September 1992. At the time it had 140 stores and was anchored by three major department stores: Sears, J. C. Penney, and Gonzalez Padin. This last one was in the mall until the company went bankrupt in 1995. The mall also had a 6-screen cinema in the area of the food court. A freestanding Circuit City operated at the mall for a brief time in the mid to late 2000s but closed after the company went bankrupt. It was replaced by a CompUSA that eventually also closed down. The space was occupied by TigerDirect until 2015.

During the 2010 Christmas holiday season, the in-mall 6-screen cinema was replaced by a new 10-screen Caribbean Cinemas multiplex located on the mall property but physically detached from the main mall structure. It is located immediately south of the main mall complex on a lot bounded on the south by Autopista Luis A. Ferre (PR-52).

In late 2012, the mall began an expansion project increasing the number of restaurants in its food court from 13 to 18 establishments.  A $2+ million  P. F. Chang's also opened on 13 May 2013. The 7,400 square feet structure has a capacity for 268 patrons.  In the fall of 2013, LongHorn Steakhouse also opened a restaurant in the mall.  Sports Authority also opened a store at this mall, its first one in Puerto Rico, in the fall of 2013. As of September 2014, Macy's was in the process of building a store at this location at a cost of $23 million. The enlarged 155,000 sf Macy's store opened in Fall 2015 and it will anchor a new concourse along with 19 new stores.  After the 2015 renovation, the entire mall was renovated including new stores such as Victoria's Secret and Bath and Body Works.

An annual artisans' fair is held at Plaza del Caribe showcasing wood-working handcrafted items, and local music.

On 7 November 2019, it was announced that Sears would be closing this location a part of a plan to close 96 stores nationwide. The store will close in February 2020, leaving the mall with JCPenney & Macy's as their two main anchor stores

Mall design
Plaza del Caribe is notable for its sophisticated design, featuring artwork scattered throughout the mall, especially in its central atrium. Exterior entrances provide access to both its first and second floors.

Current anchors
JCPenney
Macy's

Outparcels
Caribbean Cinemas 
Supermercados Pueblo
Crunch Fitness

Former anchors
Sears
Sears Brand Central
Gonzalez Padin

Outparcels
Sports Authority
CompUSA
Circuit City
TigerDirect

See also
Jaime Fonalledas
Plaza Las Americas

References

External links
Plaza del Caribe homepage 

Shopping malls in Puerto Rico
Shopping malls established in 1992
Buildings and structures in Ponce, Puerto Rico
1992 in Puerto Rico
1992 establishments in Puerto Rico
Companies based in Ponce, Puerto Rico
Tourist attractions in Ponce, Puerto Rico